Shahrak-e Emam Hoseyn (also Romanized as Shahrak-e Emām Ḩoseynʿ; also known as Emāmḩoseyn) is a village in Shurab-e Tangazi Rural District of the Central District of Kuhrang County, Chaharmahal and Bakhtiari province, Iran. At the 2006 census, its population was 974 in 164 households. The following census in 2011 counted 1,120 people in 260 households. The latest census in 2016 showed a population of 797 people in 228 households; it was the largest village in its rural district.

References 

Kuhrang County

Populated places in Chaharmahal and Bakhtiari Province

Populated places in Kuhrang County